Madson Henrique Nascimento Santos (born 9 May 1991), commonly known as Madson, is a Brazilian professional footballer who plays as a central midfielder.

Club career
Madson started his career in his home country, where he played for Paulista FC and Atlético Goianiense. In 2013, he was transferred in Europe, to the Romanian squad FC Vaslui.

Atromitos
On 8 July 2017 he moved to the Greek Superleague joining Atromitos on a two-year contract. On 14 October 2017 he scored his first goal with a stunning long shot in a 1-0 home win against Asteras Tripoli. As a result of his great performances and the attraction of interest from other teams the administration of the Greek club extended his contract until the summer of 2020. The deal also includes a buy-out clause of €1,000,000. On 28 November 2017 he scored in an emphatic 4-0 away win against Sparti for the Greek Cup, securing his team's position to the round of 16.

Career statistics

Club

References

External links
 
 

1991 births
Living people
Brazilian footballers
Footballers from São Paulo
Association football midfielders
Paulista Futebol Clube players
Atlético Clube Goianiense players
FC Vaslui players
CS Universitatea Craiova players
Atromitos F.C. players
Liga I players
Super League Greece players
Brazilian expatriate footballers
Expatriate footballers in Romania
Expatriate footballers in Greece